The Otoyol 7 (O-7; English: Motorway 7), or Kuzey Marmara Otoyolu, is a toll motorway that bypasses Istanbul to the north. The motorway is 243km in length between the Kınalı junction and the Akyazı junction, and is 8 lanes wide (4+4 lanes).

The completed section of highway crosses the Bosphorus Strait via the Yavuz Sultan Selim Bridge, which was opened in August 2016. The route is intended to serve as the outermost beltway of Istanbul as well as being the third road crossing of the Bosphorus. The route stretches  from Silivri, on the European side, to Akyazı on the Asian side. Connections to the O-4 as well as both the Bosphorus and Fatih Sultan Mehmet bridges will be built as the Northern Marmara Motorway and will bypass Istanbul to the north.

Up to 2016, the only section under construction was the  section from Odayeri to Paşaköy. In this section, 14 tunnels, 61 viaducts, 45 underpasses, and 63 overpasses will be constructed.

The western (Silivri-Odayeri) and eastern (Kurtköy-Akyazı) sections were tendered in early May 2016. Construction was then estimated to take three years and to start in 2016. The section of motorway south of O-3 was constructed in 1987 and was listed as a connector of the O-3 until 2016. The T1 and T2 tunnels on this highway were the location for the world's longest flight through a tunnel.

Exit list

Main route

Connecting route

References

External links
3rd Bosphorus Bridge and Northern Marmara Motorway

AH1
Transport in Istanbul Province
Controlled-access highways
07
Transport in Kocaeli Province
Transport in Sakarya Province
Akyazı District